Iolanda Maria Palma (born 21 April 1931 in Milan), known as Jula De Palma, is an Italian singer.

Biography
De Palma started to work in the early 1950s as a singer in radio with pianist, composer and showman Lelio Luttazzi. Early in her career she preferred to sing French songs as C'est si bon, Maître Pierre or Rien dans les mains, rien dans les poches (composed by Henri Betti), but her powerful and sophisticated voice gained fame thanks to interpretations of many jazz classics: her albums Jula in Jazz (1958), and Jula in Jazz 2 (1959), contain songs like "I've Got You Under My Skin", "One for My Baby (and One More for the Road)," and "Blues in the Night".

In 1957, she married composer Carlo Lanzi. In 1959 she performed in the "Festival di Sanremo," where she shocked the audience and the press with her passionate performance of the song "Tua." Since it was considered "too sexy," she didn't appear on the national television (RAI) for several years. However, the public maintained their interest in her.

In 1970 she performed wonderfully in a concert at the famous Sistina Theatre in Rome, gracing with her refined vocal abilities such standards as ("That Old Black Magic", "I Won't Dance" and "St. Louis Blues"); the bossa nova tune "Desafinado"; and some great Italian selections, two of them made famous by Mina ("Bugiardo e incosciente" and "Non credere"). This successful performance became available on the long playing Jula al Sistina.

In 1974, after many years of success, she retired from music and moved with her family to Canada. In 2001, she made a brief comeback on Italian television.

References

External links

  	
 Jula de Palma Official Website

Italian jazz singers
Women jazz singers
Italian women singers
1931 births
Living people
Singers from Milan